The Toromona are an indigenous people of Bolivia. They are an uncontacted people living near the upper Madidi and Heath Rivers in northwestern Bolivia. Bolivia's Administrative Resolution 48/2006, issued on 15 August 2006, created an "exclusive, reserved, and inviolable" portion of the Madidi National Park to protect the Toromona.

Language
The Toromona language is a Tacanan language.

History
No non-natives have contacted this tribe. During the Spanish colonization, Spaniards found it difficult to settle down in the area of the Amazon, where their main goal was to find a secret place called Paititi, an alleged hiding place of the Incas' biggest treasures that the Incas concealed from the Spaniards. There are some historical records that confirm that the Incas sealed tunnels in ritual ceremonies. Father Miguel Cabello de Balboa wrote about a city of gold and he described Paititi as a place protected by warrior women; he also mentioned the Toromona tribe with notes that it had no mercy in killing.

Norwegian biologist Lars Hafskjold searched exhaustively for the Toromona and became quite famous by his disappearance somewhere in the region of the Madidi park in 1997.

The Toromona have occasionally been seen by other indigenous peoples in the region. In the 21st century, anthropologist Michael Brohan was informed by members of the Araona people that they had contacted a group in voluntary isolation on the eastern bank of the Manurini River, who were speakers of either Toromona or a nearly unintelligible dialect of Araona.

Notes

External links
Bolivia: Indigenous Toromona in voluntary isolation in serious danger of disappearing, World Rainforest Movement

Uncontacted peoples
Indigenous peoples of the Amazon
Indigenous peoples in Bolivia